Gabriel Dias de Oliveira (born 10 May 1994), known as Gabriel Dias, is a Brazilian footballer who plays as either a right back or a defensive midfielder for Vasco da Gama.

References

External links

1994 births
Living people
Brazilian footballers
Association football fullbacks
Association football midfielders
Campeonato Brasileiro Série A players
Campeonato Brasileiro Série B players
Sociedade Esportiva Palmeiras players
Boa Esporte Clube players
Mogi Mirim Esporte Clube players
Clube Atlético Bragantino players
Paraná Clube players
Sport Club Internacional players
Fortaleza Esporte Clube players
Ceará Sporting Club players
Cruzeiro Esporte Clube players
CR Vasco da Gama players